Natural Brown Prom Queen is the second album from Cincinnati-born singer-songwriter and violinist Brittney Parks under her stage name Sudan Archives. The album, released on September 9, 2022 by Stones Throw Records, received widespread acclaim from music critics, with many publications ranking it as one of the best albums of 2022.

Background 
Natural Brown Prom Queen was first announced July 6. In the announcement, the album was described as following Parks as she assumed the character of Britt, "the girl next door from Cincinnati who drives around the city with the top down and shows up to high-school prom in a pink furry bikini with her thong hanging out her denim skirt." The album, "fittingly" named after a homecoming event, is all about home, both Cincinnati where Parks was born and raised as well as her adopted hometown of Los Angeles, and also features "themes of race, womanhood, and the fiercely loyal, loving relationships at the heart of Sudan's life with her family, friends, and partner."

Parks wrote and recorded the album in a home studio she built in her basement with her partner James McCall, a rapper known by the name Nocando. She had originally planned to call the album Homesick after her feelings of missing Cincinnati and her mom during the COVID-19 pandemic. The title of closing track "#513" is a reference to area code 513 which includes Cincinnati and that song also features writing and production work from Cincinnati rapper-producer Hi-Tek. Per Parks, the album's title references the project's allowing her to relive moments of her youth which she missed out on, saying she "didn't go to my prom in high school, so the idea behind calling this album Natural Brown Prom Queen is to make it my homecoming" where she "can be my natural self and it feels like I've come full circle to embrace my roots."

Prior to the album's release, Parks released four singles: "Home Maker" released March 15, "Selfish Soul" released May 18, "NBPQ (Topless)" released June 29, and "OMG Britt" released September 7. All four singles also came with music videos: "Home Maker" was directed by Jocelyn Anquetil and sees Parks starting a pillow fight in a furniture store. "Selfish Soul" was directed by Trey Lyons and features Parks playing her violin while hanging upside down from a pole as well as standing on a roof and dancing in mud with her girlfriends. "NBPQ (Topless)", directed by Augusta YR, features Parks going through a series of outfit changes and surreal, colorful scenarios, and "trippy" visuals said to be "reminiscent of David Lynch's take on Alice in Wonderland". "OMG Britt", directed by Zach Sulak, finds the singer performing the song in a series of futuristic rooms where she also smashes her violin.

Parks made her television debut on the September 20 episode of The Late Show with Stephen Colbert, performing "Selfish Soul" with a backing band including bassist Growth Eternal and three backup singers, including Keiyaa.

Reception 

 Pitchfork called the album the best new music of the week.

Year-end lists

Track listing 
Sudan Archives has writing credits on all tracks but 3 and 10, and producing credits on all tracks but 8. Ben Dickey has writing credits on all tracks but 3, 4, 10, and 13, and producing credits on all tracks but 10. Other writers and producers named below.

Personnel 
Musicians

 Sudan Archives – vocals, violin, drums, synthesizer, bass, keyboards, percussion
 Ben Dickey – bass, drums, sound effects, synthesizer, keyboards, percussion
 Simon on the Moon – bass, drums, bouzouki, keyboards, sound effects, synthesizer, zither, guitar
 Andre Elias – bass, drums, guitar, synthesizer
 Orlando Higginbottom – bass, drums, guitar, keyboards
 Chris James – guitar, keyboards, bass
 Nosaj Thing – synthesizer
 Ahya Simone – harp
 Brandon Woody – trumpet
 Kafari – keyboards
 Kesswa – backing vocals
 Qur'an Shaheed – keyboards
 Queens D. Light – vocals
 Lafemmebear – drums, drum machine

 Ciara Parks – spoken word
 Dexter Story – bass
 Cary Allison – synthesizer
 Joel Ford – bass, drums, synthesizer
 King Oliver – trumpet
 JD Reid – drums, synthesizer
 MonoNeon – bass, drums, keyboards
 Reginald Parks – vocals
 Silas Short – drum machine, guitar, percussion
 Jackson Shepard – percussion, strings, synthesizer
 Cheryl Ladd – spoken word
 Richard Lawrence – synthesizer
 Egyptian Lover – drum machine
 Jim-E Stack – bass, drums, synthesizer
 Steve Francell – guitar, keyboards, synthesizer
 Hi-Tek – bass, drums, keyboards

Technical
 Mike Bozzi – mastering engineer
 Blue May – mixing engineer
 Sudan Archives, Ben Dickey, Andre Elias, Matt Emonson, JD Reid, Dexter Story, Lafemmebear, Simon on the Moon, Joel Ford, Silas Short, Egyptian Lover, Jim-E Stack, Steve Francell, Hi-Tek – recording engineers
 Ben Dickey, Andre Elias, Lafemmebear – programming
 Wei Prior – artwork

References 

2022 albums
Sudan Archives albums
Stones Throw Records albums
Albums recorded in a home studio